Ajibade Gbadegesin Ogunoye III (born 6 July 1966) is the Olowo of Owo and Paramount Ruler of Owo Land. His father was Oba Adekola Ogunoye II, the Olowo of Owo, who reigned between 1968 and 1993. His mother was Olori Adenike Yeyesa Ogunoye. Oba Ajibade Gbadegesin Ogunoye III was presented with the staff of office by the Governor of Ondo State Arakunrin Rotimi Akeredolu on 14 December 2019.

Early career life 
Oba Ajibade Gbadegesin Ogunoye attended the Nigerian Law School in Abuja and he was consequently called to the Nigerian Bar, as barrister and solicitor of the Supreme Court of Nigeria.
He served as Ondo State Director of Finance before becoming the Olowo.

The Crown Call 
Shortly after his appointment as permanent secretary,  Oba Ajibade Gbadegesin Ogunoye III exited the civil service to ascend the exalted throne of his forefathers as the 32nd Olowo of Owo.

He was barely two years old when his father ascended the throne in 1968, and lived with him for twenty-five years.

Professional Membership 
- Institute of Public Administration of Nigeria (IPAN)
- Nigeria Institute of Management (NIM)
- Institute of Industrialists and Corporate Administrators
- Chartered Institute of Personnel Management (CIPMN)
- Fellow Institute of Chartered Mediators and Conciliators (ICMC).

Awards 
- Honorary Doctorate Degree in Public Administration (DPA) by the West African Union University Institute, Cotonou, Benin Republic
- Face of fatherhood in Africa Awards, by the CYIAP Network  in collaboration with Adeyemi College of Education, Ond 
- Honour for  Innumerable Good Works and Leadership Proficiency, by Abuja-based Spill Magazine
- Owo Progressive Association, Kano Award of Excellence for Outstanding Commitment and Exemplary Leadership
- RATTAWU NTA,  Ibadan Award of Most Outstanding Personality and Integrity.
- Grand Patron Royal Class 79.
- Grand  Patron, Law Students Association, Achievers University.
- Patron-Great Conqueror's Club of Nigeria.  
- De-Emerald Award of Excellence on Humanitarian Services.
- Merit  Award – Royal Sports Personality.
- PAN-African Leadership Transparent Centre Abuja-Excellence Leadership.
- PMAN- Performing Musician Association of Nigeria Owo Chapter  The Most Peaceful King.
- Life Patron, Ekiti State University (EKSU) Alumni Association.
- Chairman, Advisory Board of the college, Margaret Mosunmola College of  Health  Science and Technology Owo Ondo State.
- Royal Patron Bar Association Akure Branch
- Royal Patron Bar Association Owo Branch
- Ondo State Royal Leadership Personality of the Year by Ondo State Media Award

References

1966 births
Living people
Nigerian traditional rulers
Yoruba monarchs
People from Ondo State